O-sialoglycoprotein endopeptidase (glycoprotease, glycophorin A proteinase, glycoproteinase, sialoglycoprotease, sialoglycoproteinase, "OSGE") is an enzyme. This enzyme catalyses the following chemical reaction

 Hydrolysis of O-sialoglycoproteins; cleaves -Arg31-Asp- bond in glycophorin A. Does not cleave unglycosylated proteins, desialylated glycoproteins or glycoproteins that are only N-glycosylated

This enzyme is secreted by the bacterium Pasteurella haemolytica.

References

External links 
 

EC 3.4.24